Abu Ayesh Mondal (born 6 January 1944) is an  Indian politician from West Bengal belonging to All India Trinamool Congress. He is a former member of the West Bengal Legislative Assembly and Lok Sabha. He is the incumbent chairman of West Bengal Minority Development & Finance Corporation.

Early life and education
Mondal was born on 6 January 1944 at Akbarnagar in Burdwan to Abdul Ohid Mondal and Ashema Khatun. He graduated from University of Calcutta in mathematics.

Career
Mondal was elected as a member of the West Bengal Legislative Assembly from Manteswar in 1991, 1996 and 2001 as a Communist Party of India (Marxist) candidate. He was also elected as a member of the Lok Sabha from Katwa in 2006 bypoll as a Communist Party of India (Marxist) candidate.

Mondal was expelled from Communist Party of India (Marxist) for alleged anti-party activities. Later, he joined Trinamool Congress.

Mondal was appointed the chairman of West Bengal Minority Development & Finance Corporation on 7 June 2011. He served the post till 9 December 2014. He was appointed again as the chairman of West Bengal Minority Development & Finance Corporation on 25 July 2017.

Personal life
Mondal was married to Sanowara Khatun on 18 June 1962. They have three sons and two daughters.

Controversy
In July 2013 an employee of West Bengal Minority Development & Finance Corporation alleged that Mondal called her bad names over telephone. In December 2014 it was alleged that he beat a toll plaza employee with his shoe. After this allegation he resigned from West Bengal Minority Development & Finance Corporation.

References

Living people
1944 births
People from Purba Bardhaman district
West Bengal MLAs 1991–1996
West Bengal MLAs 1996–2001
West Bengal MLAs 2001–2006
Lok Sabha members from West Bengal
University of Calcutta alumni
India MPs 2004–2009
Communist Party of India (Marxist) politicians from West Bengal
Trinamool Congress politicians from West Bengal